Hubert Sitko (born 26 December 1939) is a Polish former ice hockey player. He played for Start Katowice and GKS Katowice during his career. With GKS Katowice Sitko won the Polish hockey league championship four times. He also played for the Polish national team at four World Championships as well as the 1964 Winter Olympics.

References

External links
 

1939 births
Living people
Ice hockey players at the 1964 Winter Olympics
GKS Katowice (ice hockey) players
Olympic ice hockey players of Poland
Polish ice hockey defencemen
Sportspeople from Katowice